Guarianthe bowringiana is a species of orchid. It is native to Chiapas, Belize, Guatemala, and Honduras.

References

External links 

bowringiana
Orchids of Chiapas
Orchids of Belize
Orchids of Central America
Plants described in 1885